Felda Selasih is a FELDA community in Jerteh, Besut District, Terengganu, Malaysia. The only school in the community is Sekolah Kebangsaan Felda Selasih (primary school).

Postcode 22020

References

Besut District
Federal Land Development Authority settlements
Populated places in Terengganu